KLMK may refer to:

 Kamuflirovannyi Letnyi Maskirovochnyi Kombinezon (Camouflage Summer Deceptive Coverall)
 KLMK (FM), a radio station (90.7 FM) licensed to Marvell, Arkansas, United States